Broddi Kristjansson (born 8 December 1960) is a retired male badminton player from Iceland. After his retirement, he went onto win a gold medal at the BWF World Senior Championships in 2009.

Career
Kristjansson competed in badminton at the 1992 Summer Olympics in men's singles. He lost in the first round to Teeranun Chiangta, of Thailand, 15–2, 15–12. He won more than 40 titles at the Icelandic National Badminton Championships.

Achievements

World Senior Championships

IBF International 
Men's doubles

References
European results

tournamentsoftware.com

Broddi Kristjansson
Broddi Kristjansson
Badminton players at the 1992 Summer Olympics
1960 births
Living people